Amr Yehia (born January 1, 1997) is an Egyptian professional footballer who plays as a defender for Alassiouty Sport. Yehia was called to Egypt national under-20 team preliminary squad for 2017 Africa U-20 Cup of Nations and appeared in two friendly matches, he wasn't called for the latest squad.

References

1997 births
Living people
Egyptian footballers
Association football defenders
Pyramids FC players